The William F. Butler House is a historic house in St. George, Utah. It was built as an adobe house in 1865 by William Franklin Butler, an early convert to the Church of Jesus Christ of Latter-day Saints. Butler first settled Palmyra, Utah with other Mormon converts in 1852 before moving to Spanish Fork, Utah, where he became a council member. In 1861, after President Brigham Young had asked them to, Butler moved to Southern Utah with more than 300 Mormon families and he became one of the first settlers of St. George. This house was built shortly after, and Franklin lived here with his two wives and many children. It was acquired and expanded by Henry G. Bryner, an immigrant from Switzerland and a Mormon convert, in 1886. It has been listed on the National Register of Historic Places since July 13, 1984.

References

Adobe buildings and structures
Houses completed in 1865
National Register of Historic Places in Washington County, Utah
Victorian architecture in Utah
1865 establishments in Utah Territory